Beddington is a town in Washington County, Maine, United States. The population was 60 at the 2020 census. It is the third-smallest organized town in Maine after Frye Island and Frenchboro.

Salmon migrate upstream to spawn in the town's rivers and lakes, which are part of their migration route. The majority of the town consists of blueberry fields.

Geography
Lead Mountain is located north of the town.

Demographics

2010 census
As of the census of 2010, there were 50 people, 28 households, and 15 families living in the town. The racial makeup of the town was 94.0% White, 2.0% Asian, and 4.0% from other races.

There were 28 households, of which 10.7% had children under the age of 18 living with them, 50.0% were married couples living together, 3.6% had a female householder with no husband present, and 46.4% were non-families. 32.1% of all households were made up of individuals, and 10.7% had someone living alone who was 65 years of age or older. The average household size was 1.79 and the average family size was 2.13.

The median age in the town was 57.7 years. 6% of residents were under the age of 18; 0.0% were between the ages of 18 and 24; 10% were from 25 to 44; 64% were from 45 to 64; and 20% were 65 years of age or older. The gender makeup of the town was 56.0% male and 44.0% female.

2000 census
As of the census of 2000, there were 29 people, 16 households, and 7 families living in the town. The population density was 0.8 people per square mile (0.3/km2). There were 253 housing units at an average density of 7.3 per square mile (2.8/km2). The racial makeup of the town was 96.55% White, and 3.45% from two or more races.

There were 16 households, out of which 6.3% had children under the age of 18 living with them, 43.8% were married couples living together, and 56.3% were non-families. 37.5% of all households were made up of individuals, and 12.5% had someone living alone who was 65 years of age or older. The average household size was 1.81 and the average family size was 2.43.

In the town, the population was spread out, with 6.9% under the age of 18, 6.9% from 25 to 44, 75.9% from 45 to 64, and 10.3% who were 65 years of age or older. The median age was 51 years. For every 100 females, there were 141.7 males. For every 100 females age 18 and over, there were 170.0 males.

The median income for a household in the town was $24,375, and the median income for a family was $33,750. Males had a median income of $51,250 versus $21,250 for females. The per capita income for the town was $20,180. None of the population and none of the families were below the poverty line.

References

External links
Contact Information for Beddington, Maine

Towns in Washington County, Maine
Towns in Maine